The 1966 Arizona Wildcats football team represented the University of Arizona in the Western Athletic Conference (WAC) during the 1966 NCAA University Division football season.  In their eighth and final season under head coach Jim LaRue, the Wildcats compiled a 3–7 record (1–4 against WAC opponents), finished in fifth place in the WAC, and were outscored by their opponents, 250 to 192. The team captains were Woody King and Roger Calderwood.  The team played its home games in Arizona Stadium in Tucson, Arizona. LaRue was fired after the season due to a poor win–loss record.

The team's statistical leaders included Mark Reed with 2,368 passing yards, Brad Hubbert with 501 rushing yards, and Jim Greth with 1,003 receiving yards.

Schedule

Season notes
 Arizona played three teams in the season that would be future conference foes for the Wildcats (Utah, Oregon State, and Washington State), although Utah and Arizona were in the same conference at the time (WAC), and both eventually joined Washington State and Oregon State to form the Pac-12 (Arizona joined the conference in 1978 while Utah joined in 2011).
 The Wildcats failed to win a conference home game in the season.

References

Arizona
Arizona Wildcats football seasons
Arizona Wildcats football